Placogobio bacmeensis is a species of cyprinid in the genus Placogobio. It inhabits Vietnam in inland wetlands. It has been assessed as "data deficient" on the IUCN Red List.

References

Cyprinid fish of Asia
Fish of Vietnam